Summer in the City: Live in New York is a live album, produced by Joe Jackson and Sheldon Steiger.

With semi-classical pieces on his previous three recordings, Jackson proved he had not abandoned pop altogether in June 2000, with this issue, an album drawn from an August 1999 concert. It featured Jackson playing the piano and singing, backed only by Graham Maby and drummer Gary Burke, performing some of his old songs and several covers.

The shows were recorded by Steve Remote and Sheldon Steiger over three days in August 1999 at Joe's Pub in Manhattan.

Track listing 
All songs written and arranged by Joe Jackson, except where noted.

Personnel
 Musicians
 Joe Jackson - piano, vocals
 Graham Maby – bass, vocals
 Gary Burke – drums

 Production
 Joe Jackson - arrangements, producer
 Sheldon Steiger - co-producer, recording engineer
 Dan Gellert - associate producer, engineer
 Steve Remote - recording engineer
 Sean Harkness - assistant recording engineer
 Ted Jensen - mastering engineer
 Charlie Post - mixing engineer
 P.R. Brown - art direction
 Caroline McNamara - photography

References

External links 
 Summer In The City album information at The Joe Jackson Archive

Joe Jackson (musician) live albums
2000 live albums
Sony Music live albums